The Malankara Syriac Orthodox Church is the historical title of the Indian Archbishopric of the Syriac Orthodox Church known presently as the Jacobite Syrian Christian Church since 2002.

It may also refer to:
 Malankara Church
 Malankara Syrian Church or 
 Malankara Rite.